This is a list of notable people from Bruges, who were either born in Bruges, or spent part of their life there.

People born in Bruges

Before the 19th century
Jan Breydel, leader of the uprising against the French (13th century)
Pieter de Coninck, weaver and leader of the uprising against the French (13th century)
Joannes Corvus, portrait painter
Jan Heem, craftsman and politician (13th century)
Anselm Adornes, merchant, diplomat (8 December 1424 - 1483)
Louis de Gruuthuse, Flemish knight, courtier, and nobleman (1427–1492)
Philip I of Castile, first Habsburg ruler in Spain (1478–1506)
Adriaen Isenbrant, Renaissance painter (1490–1551)
Adrian Willaert, composer of the Renaissance (c. 1490–1562, birth in Bruges uncertain)
Petrus Vulcanius, humanist scholar and administrator (c 1503-1571)
Bonaventura Vulcanius, humanist scholar (1538-1614)
Levina Teerlinc, Flemish miniaturist (1510–1576)
Johannes Vasaeus, humanist, teacher, historian (1511-1561)
Marcus Gheeraerts the Elder, engraver, illustrator, and painter (c. 1520 – c. 1590)
Marcus Gheeraerts the Younger, painter (1561–1636)
Stradanus, mannerist painter (1523–1605)
Pamelius, theologian (1536–1587)
Peter Candid, painter and architect (1548–1628, birth in Bruges uncertain)
Simon Stevin, mathematician and engineer (1548–1620)
Franciscus Gomarus, Calvinist theologian (1563–1641)
Louis de Deyster, Flemish painter (1656–1711)

19th century
Henri Milne-Edwards, French zoologist (1800–1885)
Eugène Charles Catalan, mathematician (1814–1894)
Paul Jean Clays, marine painter (1819–1900)
Émile Louis Victor de Laveleye, economist (1822–1892)
Guido Gezelle, poet and priest (1830–1899)
Eugène Goossens, père, conductor (1845–1906)
Albin van Hoonacker, Catholic theologian and Biblical scholar (1857–1933)
Frank Brangwyn, Welsh artist, painter, colourist, engraver, and illustrator (1867–1956)
Dobbelaer, a stained glass designer and maker (c. 1880)

20th century
Nelly Landry, French tennis player (1916–2010)
Hugo Claus, novelist, poet, playwright, painter, and film director (1929–2008)
Jean Schramme, colonel and mercenary in Katanga (1929–1988)
Andries Van den Abeele, historian, historical preservationist, entrepreneur and politician (councilor and alderman of Bruges) (born 1935)
Noël Devisch, agriculture (born 1943)
Jean-Pierre Van Rossem, politician, entrepreneur, and writer (1945-2018)
Alain Billiet, alleged designer of the euro sign (born 1951)
Pierre Chevalier, politician (born 1952)
Pieter Aspe, writer of detective stories (1953-2021)
Kris Defoort, avant-garde jazz pianist and composer (born 1959)
Frank Vanhecke, politician (born 1959)
Geert Hoste, cabaret performer (born 1960)
Filip Dewinter, politician (born 1962)
Peter Verhelst, novelist, poet, and dramatist (born 1962)
Peter Verhoyen, flautist and piccolo player (born 1968)
Geoffrey Claeys, football player (born 1974)
Olivier De Cock, football player (born 1975)
Denis Viane, football player (born 1977)
Gotye, Australian-Belgian singer songwriter (born 1980)
Tony Parker, basketball player (born 1982)

21st century
Thomas Van den Keybus, football player (born 2001)

Lived in Bruges

15th century
Philip the Good, Duke of Burgundy
Giovanni Arnolfini, Italian merchant
Adrien Basin, Franco-Flemish composer, singer, and diplomat
William Caxton, English merchant, diplomat, write, and printer
Petrus Christus, Flemish painter
Gerard David, Renaissance painter
Lupus Hellinck, composer of the Renaissance
Gilles Joye, Franco-Flemish composer of the Renaissance
Roger Machado, diplomat and officer of arms
Hans Memling, Flemish painter
Tommaso Portinari, Italian banker for the Medici bank
Jan Provoost, Flemish painter
Jean Richafort, Franco-Flemish composer of the Renaissance
Jan van Eyck, Flemish painter
Juan Luís Vives, Spanish scholar and humanist

16th century until now
George Cassander, Flemish theologian (1513–1566)
Pieter Pourbus, Flemish Renaissance painter (1523–1584)
Bernard Jungmann, German theologian and ecclesiastical historian (1833–1895)
Fernand Khnopff, symbolist painter (1858–1921)
Georges Emile Lebacq, Belgian artist, painter, colourist, pastellist, Impressionist, Post-Impressionist (1876–1950)
Karel Verleye and Hendrik Brugmans, founders of the College of Europe
Godfried Danneels, archbishop and cardinal (born 1933)
Pieter Aspe, writer
Salah Abdeslam Terrorist accused of involvement in the November 2015 Paris Attacks, and the March 2016 Brussels Attacks. (Born September 15th 1989)

Bruges

Bruges
Bruges